Democratic Republic of the Congo first competed at the Paralympic Games in 2012, at the Summer Games in London, sending two wheelchair athletes to compete in track and field events.

The D.R. Congo has never taken part in the Winter Paralympic Games, and no athlete from this country has ever won a Paralympic medal.

Full results for the DRC at the Paralympics

See also
 DR Congo at the Olympics

References